Raj Rajeshwar Maharajadhiraj Shri Hanwant Singh Rathore of Jodhpur (16 June 1923 – 26 January 1952) was the ruler of the Indian princely state of Jodhpur. He succeeded his father as Maharaja of Jodhpur on 9 June 1947 and held the title till his death in a plane crash on 26 January 1952.

Family life

In 1943 he married Maharani Krishna Kumari Sahiba of Dhrangadhra and had three children, the youngest child, a son Gaj Singh Rathore; who succeeded him,  daughter Sailesh Kumari married in Banswara; and daughter, Chandresh Kumari Katoch of Kangra, In 1948, he met 19-year-old Scottish nurse Sandra McBryde, with whom he had a tempestuous and brief union. Later he married the Muslim actress Zubeida who converted to Hinduism as Vidya Rani, by whom he had a son named Hukum Singh Rathore (Tutu Bana), but soon after their marriage he received rebuke from the royal  family and as a result he started to live in Mehrangarh. From her first marriage, Zubeida had a son, Khalid Mohammed, a film critic and director.

After their death, his son Tutu was brought up by Rajmata Krishna Kumari of Jodhpur, and later went to study at Mayo College in Ajmer. He married Rao Rani Rajeshwari Kumari Rathore, daughter of Rao Raja Daljit Singh of Alwar. The couple had one son, Parikshit Singh Rathore (b. 1974) and one daughter, Jainandini Kanwar (b. 1975). However, on 17 April 1981, he was beheaded and found on the streets of Jodhpur.

Final years

After Indian independence and formation of Rajasthan as a state within India, he formed a new political party, Akhil Bhartiya Ramrajya Parishad in 1952. Campaigning in both the Indian general and state Assembly elections scheduled for February 1952, Hanwant Singh would have won a majority in his region. After only four hours of sleep he took off in a small aircraft with his wife, Zubeida on 26 January 1952. The plane crashed near Sumerpur, killing him at the age of 28. Zubeidaa also perished in the accident.

In 2011, wreckage of the aircraft, Beechcraft Bonanza, a light six-seater aircraft, was discovered inside Jodhpur Central Jail. Subsequently, in 2012, the Mehrangarh Fort Museum founded in 1972 by Maharaja Gaj Singh, formally asked the jail to transfer the wreckage to the museum.

See also
Rulers of Marwar

References

1923 births
1952 deaths
Monarchs of Marwar
Indian polo players
Rajasthani politicians
Aviators killed in aviation accidents or incidents in India
People from Jodhpur
Polo players from Rajasthan
Victims of aviation accidents or incidents in 1952
20th-century Indian monarchs